Nam Shan is the name of several places in Hong Kong, including:

 Nam Shan (Sai Kung District), a village in Sai Kung District
 Nam Shan (Sha Tin District), a village in the Siu Lek Yuen area of Sha Tin District
 Nam Shan Estate, a public housing estate in Shek Kip Mei
 Nam Shan, Tai Hang Tung & Tai Hang Sai (constituency), a constituency of Sham Shui Po District

See also
 南山 (disambiguation)
 Nam Long Shan